Santa Rosa de Yavarí is an Amazonian town in the Mariscal Ramón Castilla Province in the Loreto Region of Peru.

Geography
The town is in the international Tres Fronteras area of the Upper Amazon region, in the western Amazon basin.

It  is located in an island in the Amazon River.  The cities of Leticia (Colombia) and Tabatinga (Brazil) are across from it on the 'mainland' river banks of the Amazon.

Border crossings
The town serves as a checkpoint and crossing point for the Brazil-Peru and the Brazil-Colombia borders.

See also

References

Populated places in the Loreto Region
Populated places on the Amazon
Tres Fronteras
Upper Amazon
Brazil–Peru border crossings
Colombia–Peru border crossings